The Leland School District is a public school district based in Leland, Mississippi (USA).

Schools
Leland High School
Leland Elementary School
Leland School Park

Demographics

2006–07 school year
There were a total of 1,127 students enrolled in the Leland School District during the 2006–2007 school year. The gender makeup of the district was 49% female and 51% male. The racial makeup of the district was 91.39% African American, 6.83% White, 1.69% Hispanic, and 0.09% Asian. 85.2% of the district's students were eligible to receive free lunch.

Previous school years

Accountability statistics

See also

List of school districts in Mississippi

References

External links
 
 Leland School District (Archive)

Education in Washington County, Mississippi
School districts in Mississippi